The Noralta Junior Hockey League is a Junior "C" ice hockey league in Alberta, Canada, sanctioned by Hockey Canada, under Hockey Alberta. It currently has 11 teams throughout the greater Edmonton area.

History
 
The league was founded in 1992 as a non-contact juvenile league known as the North Central Junior Hockey League. The original two teams were located in St. Albert and Sherwood Park. The league added a team in Edmonton in 1993 on condition it would be a non-contact league. The league was back down to two teams in 1994.

Body contact and strict fighting rules were adopted for the 1995–96 season which attracted teams back. Teams from Drayton Valley, Edmonton Braves, St Albert Shooters and Thorhild competed in the circuits first full season. Provincial play was contested for the first time in 1996 with St Albert hosting a four-team provincial. Sexsmith Vipers were the first Hockey Alberta Junior C Provincial winner defeating Grande Prairie Wheelers in the final.

The circuit was reorganized for the 1996–97 season expanding to eight teams (Beaumont Braves, Calahoo, Fort Saskatchewan, Legal, Morinville Super C's, Paul Band, St. Albert Shooters and Thorhild),

St. Albert rebranded as the Mustangs for the 1997–98 while Fort Saskatchewan, Legal and Thorhild folded. Calahoo and Paul Band would fold after the 1998–99 season.

On January 18, 2001 the league held its first annual All-Star Game in memory of longtime local volunteer John Anderson.

The league was incorporated as the Noralta Junior Hockey League on December 22, 2003 as league membership grew to 13 teams.

In 2015 Noralta Junior Hockey League partnered with Friends of Alberta Junior Hockey Society to provide hockey players with scholarships to continue on to higher education after high school while staying in competitive ice hockey. Since its inception the scholarships have been given out on a yearly basis to many recipients.

The league added the New Sarepta Falcons to the league for the 2017–18 season. Fort Saskatchewan Jr. C Traders withdrew before that same season over speculation of the city getting a new Alberta Junior Hockey League team.

The Edmonton-based Junior Braves were added to the league for the 2018–19 season. Beaumont Buccaneers joined for 2021–22.

Teams

Former teams
 Calahoo (1996–99)
 Drayton Valley (1996–97)
Edmonton Avalanche (2009–2019)
 Edmonton Braves (1995–96) - relocated to Beaumont
Beaumont Braves (1996–2007; 2009–13)
 Edmonton Capitals (1997–??)
 Edmonton Ice (2006–13)
 Edmonton Firebirds (????–10)
Edmonton Rivermen (2001–03) - renamed RCAC Rivermen
Fort Saskatchewan (1996–97)
Fort Saskatchewan Mustangs (1999–2007)
Fort Saskatchewan Rangers (2013–2014) - renamed Jr. C Traders 
Fort Saskatchewan Jr. C Traders (2014–17)
 Legal (1996–97)
 Millet Lightning (2006–14)
 Morinville Titans (2009–2019) - assumed original name Morinville Super C's
New Sarepta Falcons (2017–19) - renamed New Sarepta Blades (2019–21)
Northeast Zone Northstars (2006–20)
 Oil Capital Blades (2000–01) - renamed Edmonton Blades
Edmonton Blades (2001–??)
 Oil Capital Wildcats (1999–2001) - renamed Edmonton Wildcats
Edmonton Wildcats (2001–??)
 Paul Band (1996–99)
RBQ Desperados (??–2007)
St. Albert Shooters (1992–97) - renamed St. Albert Mustangs
St. Albert Mustangs (1997–02) - renamed St. Albert Blues
St. Albert Blues (2002–12) - renamed St. Albert Comets
 Seera Stealth (2009–16)
Sherwood Park (1992–97)
SouthWest Zone Sentinels (2007–11)
 Strathcona Sabres (~2002–08)
 Thorhild (1995–97)
 Wabamun Wings (2006–12)

Champions
Typically the champion and two runners-up compete against the top three teams of the Calgary Junior C Hockey League for the Hockey Alberta Provincial Junior "C" title.

References

External links 
 NJHL website
 Hockey Alberta Provincial Championships

Ice hockey leagues in Alberta
C